{{Infobox horseraces
|class      = Group 3
|horse race = Geoffrey Freer Stakes
|image      = 
|caption    = 
|location   = Newbury RacecourseNewbury, England
|inaugurated = 1949
|race type  = Flat
|sponsor    = BetVictor
|website    = Newbury
|distance   = 1m 5f 61y (2,671 m)
|surface    = Turf
|track      = Left-handed
|qualification = Three-years-old and up
|weight     = 8 st 10 lb (3yo);9 st 5 lb (4yo+)<small>Allowances3 lb for fillies and maresPenalties7 lb for Group 1 winners *5 lb for Group 2 winners *3 lb for Group 3 winners **after 2017</small>
|purse      = £68,000 (2022)1st: £40,000
|bonuses    = 
}}

|}

The Geoffrey Freer Stakes is a Group 3 flat horse race in Great Britain open to horses aged three years or older. It is run at Newbury over a distance of 1 mile, 5 furlongs and 61 yards (2,671 metres), and it is scheduled to take place each year in August.

History
The event was established in 1949, and it was originally called the Oxfordshire Stakes. It was founded by Geoffrey Freer, a Jockey Club handicapper who served as the manager of Newbury Racecourse. The venue had been used as an American military supply depot during World War II, and Freer restored the course in the post-war period. The race was renamed in his honour in 1969, the year after his death.

For a period the Geoffrey Freer Stakes was classed at Group 2 level. It was relegated to its current status, Group 3, in 2006.

The leading three-year-olds from the race sometimes go on to compete in the following month's St. Leger Stakes.

Records
Most successful horse (3 wins):
 Mubtaker – 2002, 2003, 2004

Leading jockey (4 wins):
 Lester Piggott – Court Command (1956), Valinsky (1977), Ardross (1981, 1982)
 Pat Eddery – Realistic (1974), Consol (1975), Moon Madness (1987), Silver Patriarch (1999)
 Frankie Dettori – Charmer (1990), Drum Taps (1991), Phantom Gold (1996), Kite Wood (2009)

Leading trainer (5 wins):
 Noel Murless – Ridge Wood (1949), Court Command (1956), Hopeful Venture (1967), Rangong (1969), Attica Meli (1973)

Winners since 1979

Earlier winners

 1949: Ridge Wood
 1950: Tilloy
 1951: Le Sage
 1952: Westinform
 1953: Harwin
 1954: Umberto
 1955: True Cavalier
 1956: Court Command
 1957: Court Harwell
 1958: Owen Glendower
 1959: Kalydon
 1960: High Hat
 1961: Sagacity
 1962: Sovrango
 1963: Sovrango
 1964: Sunseeker
 1965: Court Gift
 1966: Charlottown
 1967: Hopeful Venture
 1968: Levmoss
 1969: Rangong
 1970: High Line
 1971: High Line
 1972: Sol'Argent
 1973: Attica Meli
 1974: Realistic
 1975: Consol
 1976: Swell Fellow
 1977: Valinsky
 1978: Ile de Bourbon

See also
 Horse racing in Great Britain
 List of British flat horse races
 Recurring sporting events established in 1949 – this race is included under its original title, Oxfordshire Stakes.References
 Racing Post:

 galopp-sieger.de – Geoffrey Freer Stakes (ex Oxfordshire Stakes). horseracingintfed.com – International Federation of Horseracing Authorities – Geoffrey Freer Stakes (2018). pedigreequery.com – Geoffrey Freer Stakes – Newbury.''
 

Flat races in Great Britain
Newbury Racecourse
Open long distance horse races